Lovćen Cetinje, commonly abbreviated as SD Lovćen, is a sports society organisation from Cetinje, Montenegro. By tradition, number of titles and historical results, it's one of the most successful sports societies in Montenegro. Currently, there is 13 clubs in 10 different sports inside SD Lovćen organisation.

Clubs
Currently, multiple clubs in Montenegro of different sports share the name Lovćen. Their management is separate and each operate independently from each other. Totally, there is 13 different clubs in 10 sports under the SD Lovćen organisation.

Sources:

Honours and titles / team sports
Teams and sportists of SD Lovćen Cetinje won numerous titles of champions of Montenegro, Yugoslavia and on European individual tournaments. During the history, teams of SD Lovćen in team sports (football, handball, basketball, volleyball, rugby) won 19 national trophies.

Lovćen Football Club
National Championship: 
 Runner-up: 1 (2013–14)
National Cup: 
 Winner: 1 (2013–14)
 Runner-up: 1 (2008–09)
National Order of the Montenegrin flag: 
2013

Lovćen Handball Club
National Championship: 
 Winner: 10 (1999-00, 2000-01, 2006-07, 2011-12, 2012-13, 2013-14, 2014-15, 2017/18, 2018/19, 2019/20)
 Runner-up: 9 (1996-97, 1998-99, 2001-02, 2002-03, 2007-08, 2008-09, 2010-11, 2015-16, 2016-17)
National Cup: 
 Winner: 12 (2001-02, 2002-03, 2008-09, 2009-10, 2010-11, 2011-12, 2012-13, 2013-14, 2014-15, 2016-17, 2017/18, 2019/20)
 Runner-up: 2 (2006–07, 2015-16)
EHF Champions League: 
 5th place: (2000-01)

Lovćen Basketball Club
National Championship: 
 Runner-up: 2 (2006-07, 2008-09)
National Cup: 
 Runner-up: 2 (2006-07, 2010-11)
Balkan League: 
 Runner-up: 1 (2009-10)

Lovćen Women Basketball Club
National Championship: 
 Runner-up: 3 (2014-15, 2015-16, 2016-17)
National Cup: 
 Runner-up: 3 (2014-15, 2015-16, 2016-17)

Lovćen Rugby Club
National Sevens Championship: 
 Winner: 1 (2014-15)
National Championship: 
 Runner-up: 2 (2014-15)

See also
FK Lovćen
RK Lovćen
KK Lovćen
ŽFK Lovćen
ŽOK Lovćen Cetinje
Rugby Club Lovćen
Stadion Sveti Petar Cetinjski
Cetinje

References

Lovćen Cetinje
FK Lovćen Cetinje
Multi-sport clubs in Montenegro